Neodecanoic acid is a mixture of carboxylic acids with the common structural formula C10H20O2, a molecular weight of 172.26 g/mol, with a boling point of 243-253 °C (482 to 494 °F), a melting point of -39 °C (<104 °F) and the CAS number 26896-20-8. Components of the mixture are acids with the common property of a "trialkyl acetic acid" having three alkyl groups at carbon two, including:
 2,2,3,5-Tetramethylhexanoic acid
 2,4-Dimethyl-2-isopropylpentanoic acid
 2,5-Dimethyl-2-ethylhexanoic acid
 2,2-Dimethyloctanoic acid
 2,2-Diethylhexanoic acid

References

Alkanoic acids